Noel Park and Wood Green is a closed railway station on the Palace Gates Line in Wood Green, north London. It was located on the north-east side of The Broadway adjacent to Pelham Road. Its site is now occupied by Wood Green Shopping City.

The station was opened by the Great Eastern Railway as Green Lanes on 1 January 1878, as the temporary terminus of the line, which was extended to Palace Gates (Wood Green) station on 7 October 1878.

In 1884, as work began on the large Noel Park housing estate nearby, the station name was changed to Green Lanes & Noel Park; it was given its final name in 1902.

Competing as it did with other nearby railway lines and the London Underground's Piccadilly line, the Palace Gates line was unprofitable; the line and the station were closed for passenger services on 7 January 1963, and for freight on 7 December 1964. Following closure, the embankment that housed the station and the bridge over The Broadway was removed. Nothing is left of the station.

References

External links
 
 

Disused railway stations in the London Borough of Haringey
Former Great Eastern Railway stations
Railway stations in Great Britain opened in 1878
Railway stations in Great Britain closed in 1963
Wood Green